Dean Liço (born 8 February 2000) is an Albanian football player.

Club career
On 22 September 2020, he signed a multi-year contract with Italian Serie B club Ascoli. He made his Serie B debut for Ascoli on 24 October 2020 in a game against Salernitana. He substituted Abdelhamid Sabiri at half-time.

On 5 September 2021, he was loaned to Partizani Tirana.

On 13 July 2022, he has been released by the club.

References

External links
 

2000 births
Footballers from Korçë
Albanian footballers
Living people
Albania youth international footballers
Albania under-21 international footballers
Association football midfielders
Ascoli Calcio 1898 F.C. players
FK Partizani Tirana players
Serie B players
Kategoria Superiore players
Albanian expatriate footballers
Expatriate footballers in Spain
Albanian expatriate sportspeople in Spain
Expatriate footballers in Portugal
Albanian expatriate sportspeople in Portugal
Expatriate footballers in Italy
Albanian expatriate sportspeople in Italy